Cosmioconcha is a genus of sea snails, marine gastropod mollusks in the family Columbellidae, the dove snails.

Species
Species within the genus Cosmioconcha include:
 Cosmioconcha calliglypta Dall & Simpson, 1901 -  America - flame dovesnail
 Cosmioconcha costattenuata Pelorce, 2017
 Cosmioconcha dedonderi Monsecour & Monsecour, 2006
 Cosmioconcha flammea Pelorce, 2017
 Cosmioconcha geigeri Garcia, 2006
 Cosmioconcha grenoni Pelorce, 2017
 Cosmioconcha helenae (Costa, 1988)  (synonyms : Anachis helenae F. H. A. Costa, 1983; Costoanachis helenae (F. H. A. Costa, 1983))
 Cosmioconcha humfreyi De Jong & Coomans, 1988
 Cosmioconcha modesta Powys, 1835 - West America
 Cosmioconcha nana Garcia, 2007
 Cosmioconcha nitens (C. B. Adams, 1850) (synonyms : Columbella perpicta Dall & Simpson 1901; Astyris perpicta Dall & Simpson 1901; Mitrella perpicta Dall & Simpson, 1901 )
 Cosmioconcha palmeri W. H. Dall, 1913  - West America
 Cosmioconcha parvula W. H. Dall, 1913 - West America
 Cosmioconcha pergracilis W. H. Dall, 1913 - West America
 Cosmioconcha rehderi J. G. Hertlein & A. M. Strong, 1951 - West America
 Cosmioconcha rikae Monsecour & Monsecour, 2006
 Cosmioconcha sirderae Pelorce, 2017

References

 Pelorce J. (2017). Les Columbellidae (Gastropoda: Neogastropoda) de la Guyane française. Xenophora Taxonomy. 14: 4-21

Further reading
 Costa, F. H. A. 1983. Anachis helenae, nova espécie de Columbellidae do litoral Brasileiro (Mollusca: Gastropoda). Anais da Sociedade Nordestina de Zoologia 1: 95-99
 Adams, C. B. 1850. Descriptions of supposed new species of marine shells, which inhabit Jamaica. Contributions to Conchology 4: 56–68. [Stated date: -- Jan 1850.]
 Dall, W. H. and C. T. Simpson. 1901. The Mollusca of Porto Rico. U. S. Fisheries Commission Bulletin 20: 351–524, pls. 53–58.
 Dunker, [W.] 1853. Diagnoses molluscorum novorum. Zeitschrift für Malakozoologie 10: 58–60.

Columbellidae